The Paengma Line is a non-electrified standard-gauge secondary line of the Korean State Railway in North P'yŏngan Province, North Korea, running from Yŏmju on the P'yŏngŭi Line to South Sinŭiju, likewise on the P'yŏngui Line.

Description

History 
For the original line's history and other information prior to 1945, see Gyeongui Line (1904–1945).

The Namsi (now Yŏmju)–South Sinŭiju stretch of railway via Paengma was opened on 28 April 1905 by the Temporary Military Railway as part of the mainline of the Kyŏngŭi Line from Kyŏngsŏng (Seoul) to Sinŭiju. On 16 October 1943, South Sinŭiju Station became a connecting station with the Sinŭiju–Yangsi–Namsi Yangsi Line, which the Chosen Government Railway had taken over from the privately owned Tasado Railway on 1 April of that year.

After the establishment of the DPRK and the nationalisation of its railways to create the Korean State Railway, the line from Ryongch'ŏn (formerly Yangsi) to Yŏmju (formerly Namsi) remained separate as the Yangsi Line. In 1964 the Korean State Railway decided to make the shorter Yangsi Line the mainline of the P'yŏngui Line, and the former mainline between Yŏmju and South Sinŭiju was separated, becoming the current Paengma Line.

Services

There is extensive freight traffic on the line, serving the large Ponghwa Chemical Complex at Paengma and several other factories.

A pair of local trains, numbered 418/419, operate between Sinŭiju Ch'ŏngnyŏn and Yŏmju, running along this line instead of the P'yŏngŭi line. There is also a short branch from Paengma to the private Songhwa Residence.

Route 
A yellow background in the "Distance" box indicates that section of the line is not electrified.

References
 Ministry of Railways (1937), 鉄道停車場一覧. 昭和12年10月1日現在(The List of the Stations), p485

Railway lines in North Korea
Standard gauge railways in North Korea